Rocío Orsi Portalo (Madrid, 3 February 1976 - Madrid, 29 November 2014) was a Spanish philosopher, essayist, and translator, as well as a professor of philosophy at Charles III University of Madrid (UC3M). She is considered to be one of the most important Spanish-language thinkers of her generation.

Education

Career and research
Since 1999, she was a research fellow at UC3M and a professor since 2004. She developed research and work stays in Paris, Cambridge, New York City (Columbia University), and Bologna, Italy, participating in numerous research projects.

She was also active in civil society. She was one of the first signatories of the manifesto, .

Orsi cultivated the history of ideas, political and moral philosophy, epistemology, gender studies, and political economy. Her initial topics of interest were the relations between philosophy and literature and between epistemological and moral problems. She was later concerned with questions of the philosophy of history and, in the period immediately preceding her untimely death, planned a systematic study of ancient skepticism and its modern reception.

Death and legacy
Orsi died of cancer in 2014. Since 2016, UC3M has awarded the Rocío Orsi Prize to the best master's degree thesis in the Faculty of Humanities, Communication and Documentation.

Selective works

Books 
 El saber del error. Filosofía y tragedia en Sófocles, 2007.
 Butterfield y la razón histórica, 2013.
 La economía a la intemperie, with Andrés González, 2015.

As editor
 El desencanto como promesa. Fundamentación, alcance y límites de la razón práctica, Rocío Orsi, ed., Biblioteca Nueva, Madrid, 2006, with Carlos Thiebaut, prologue by Javier Muguerza.
 Ritmos contemporáneos. Género, política y sociedad en los siglos XIX y XX, Rocío Orsi and Laura Branciforte, eds., Dykinson, Madrid, 2012.
 La guillotina del poder, Rocío Orsi and Laura Branciforte, eds., Plaza y Valdés, Madrid, 2015.

References

1976 births
2014 deaths
People from Madrid
21st-century Spanish philosophers
Spanish essayists
Spanish translators
Spanish academics
Autonomous University of Madrid alumni
Charles III University of Madrid alumni
Academic staff of the Charles III University of Madrid
Deaths from cancer in Spain